Todd Walker (born 13 March 1998) is a South African cricketer. He made his List A debut for South Western Districts in the 2016–17 CSA Provincial One-Day Challenge on 12 March 2017. He made his first-class debut for South Western Districts in the 2016–17 Sunfoil 3-Day Cup on 23 March 2017. He made his Twenty20 debut for South Western Districts in the 2017 Africa T20 Cup on 25 August 2017.

References

External links
 

1998 births
Living people
South African cricketers
South Western Districts cricketers
Place of birth missing (living people)